Bactris major is a small to medium-sized (1–10 m tall) spiny palm which ranges from Mexico, through Central America into northern South America and Trinidad.  The species is divided into three or four varieties, although the boundaries between varieties is not always clearly defined.

The fruits are eaten or used to flavour drinks.

Spanish names for the palm species include marayaú.

Varieties
Rafaël Govaerts recognised three varieties:

 Bactris major var. major
 Bactris major var. infesta (Mart.) Drude
 Bactris major var. socialis (Mart.) Drude

Andrew Henderson and co-authors recognised a fourth variety, Bactris major var. megalocarpa (Trail ex Thurn) A.J.Hend., but Govaerts considered this to be a synonym of Bactris major var. major.

References

major
Trees of Mexico
Trees of Central America
Trees of Trinidad and Tobago
Trees of South America